Bespyatovo is the name of several rural localities in Moscow Oblast, Russia:
Bespyatovo, Stupinsky District, Moscow Oblast, a village in Aksinyinskoye Rural Settlement of Stupinsky District
Bespyatovo, Zaraysky District, Moscow Oblast, a village in Gololobovskoye Rural Settlement of Zaraysky District